Anatoly Khamidullayevich Asrabayev (Анатолий Хамидуллаевич Асрабаев; born May 5, 1969) is an Uzbekistani sport shooter who competed for the Unified Team. He won the silver medal in 10 metre running target in Barcelona in the 1992 Summer Olympics in Barcelona. Asrabayev was born in Tashkent and was affiliated with Dynamo Tashkent.

References

1969 births
Living people
Sportspeople from Tashkent
Uzbekistani male sport shooters
Shooters at the 1992 Summer Olympics
Olympic medalists in shooting
Olympic shooters of the Unified Team
Olympic silver medalists for the Unified Team
ISSF rifle shooters
Medalists at the 1992 Summer Olympics
Dynamo sports society athletes